Reedsburg Municipal Airport,  is a city-owned, public use airport located one mile (two km) east of the central business district of Reedsburg, Wisconsin, a city in Sauk County, Wisconsin. It is included in the Federal Aviation Administration (FAA) National Plan of Integrated Airport Systems for 2021–2025, in which it is categorized as a local general aviation facility.

Although most airports in the United States use the same three-letter location identifier for the FAA and International Air Transport Association (IATA), this airport is assigned C35 by the FAA but has no designation from the IATA.

Facilities and aircraft 

Reedsburg Municipal Airport covers an area of 153 acres (62 ha) at an elevation of 906 feet (276 m) above mean sea level. It has two runways: 18/36 is 4,840 by 75 feet (1,475 x 23 m) with an asphalt surface, it has approved GPS approaches and 7/25 is 2,510 by 50 feet (765 x 15 m) with an asphalt surface.

For the 12-month period ending April 9, 2021, the airport had 14,300 aircraft operations, an average of 39 per day: 97% general aviation, 2% air taxi and 1% military.
In January 2023, there were 20 aircraft based at this airport: 19 single-engine and 1 multi-engine.

See also
List of airports in Wisconsin

References

External links 
 Airport page at City of Reedsburg website
 

Airports in Wisconsin
Airports in Sauk County, Wisconsin
Reedsburg, Wisconsin